Samuel Arthur Gunton (1883–1959) was an English professional footballer who played in the Football League for Gainsborough Trinity and Burnley as a right back.

Personal life 
Gunton served in the Norfolk Regiment between 1899 and 1908. After the outbreak of the First World War in 1914, he was recalled to the army and served as a sergeant with the Norfolk Regiment and the Royal Dublin Fusiliers during the war.

References

1883 births
1959 deaths
Footballers from Norwich
English footballers
Norwich City F.C. players
Doncaster Rovers F.C. players
Gainsborough Trinity F.C. players
Burnley F.C. players
English Football League players
Midland Football League players
British Army personnel of World War I
Royal Norfolk Regiment soldiers
Royal Dublin Fusiliers soldiers
Association football fullbacks
Military personnel from Norwich